Hellmuth Wolff (September 3, 1937 – November 20, 2013) was a Canadian organ builder and the founder of the firm Wolff & Associés.

Life
Born in Zurich, Switzerland, Wolff apprenticed to Metzler & Söhne in nearby Dietikon. He then worked for Rieger Orgelbau of Schwarzach, Vorarlberg, and Charles Fisk of Gloucester, Massachusetts, before emigrating to Canada in 1963 to be a designer in the new mechanical action department of Casavant Frères of St-Hyacinthe, Quebec.He worked briefly with Karl Wilhelm before establishing his own firm in 1968 in Laval, Quebec. Between 1968 and 2008, Wolff designed, built, and installed fifty instruments in churches, universities, concert halls, and homes across North America. Wolff's largest organ is of 61 stops, 85 ranks, which he installed in Christ Church Cathedral, Victoria, British Columbia in 2005.

References

External links 
 Hellmuth Wolff Organ Collection at Marvin Duchow Music Library McGill University

1937 births
2013 deaths
People from Laval, Quebec
Swiss pipe organ builders
Canadian pipe organ builders
People from Zürich
Swiss emigrants to Canada